Thomas Marion Dodd (born August 15, 1958) is an American former professional baseball player. He had a short two-week stint in the major leagues with the 1986 Baltimore Orioles, but is likely best remembered for being one of the players included in the deal that brought Fred McGriff to the Toronto Blue Jays as a minor league prospect.

Yankee farmhand
A highly touted prospect himself, Dodd was drafted by the Oakland Athletics out of the University of Oregon in the second round of the 1979 Major League Baseball draft, but did not sign. A year later, he was drafted by the New York Yankees in the first round (seventh overall) of the secondary phase of the 1980 Major League Baseball draft.

In , Dodd hit 29 home runs and had 95 runs batted in as a member of the Greensboro Hornets.

McGriff deal
Early in the  season, he, fellow Yankees farmhand Jeff Reynolds and first baseman Dave Revering were traded to the Toronto Blue Jays for John Mayberry. After the season, the Yankees reacquired Dodd and relief pitcher Dale Murray for Fred McGriff, Dave Collins and Mike Morgan. Third baseman Graig Nettles was also supposed to be included in the deal, but when the Jays refused to give him a hefty bonus, the Yankees included cash in the deal to compensate.

MLB debut
The Yankees released Dodd the following May. Shortly afterwards, he signed with the Chicago White Sox, with whom he remained through the  season. The ChiSox released him just before the start of the  minor league season. He signed with the Baltimore Orioles, and batted .300 for the first time in his career for the Orioles' Southern League and Carolina League affiliates.

Along the way, he earned a promotion to the big league club. He made his major league debut on July 25, drawing a walk in his only at-bat.

He entered seven games as a pinch hitter, remaining in one at third base, despite the fact that he had made very few appearances as a third baseman in his minor league career. He hit his only major league home run in his only major league start on August 1 when manager Earl Weaver used Dodd as his designated hitter against the Toronto Blue Jays.

He spent three more seasons in the Kansas City Royals' and Seattle Mariners farm systems before retiring. In his final season as a pro, Dodd led the Pacific Coast League in RBI with 114 for the Calgary Cannons.

References

External links

1958 births
Living people
American expatriate baseball players in Canada
Baltimore Orioles players
Baseball players from Portland, Oregon
Benson Polytechnic High School alumni
Calgary Cannons players
Charlotte O's players
Fort Lauderdale Yankees players
Glens Falls White Sox players
Greensboro Hornets players
Hagerstown Suns players
Knoxville Blue Jays players
Major League Baseball third basemen
Nashville Sounds players
Omaha Royals players
Rochester Red Wings players
Oregon Ducks baseball players